Bhusawal Assembly constituency is one of the 288 Vidhan Sabha constituencies of Maharashtra state in western India. This constituency is located in Jalgaon district.

Bhusawal is part of the Raver Lok Sabha constituency along with four other Vidhan Sabha segments in this district, namely Chopda, Raver, Jamner and Muktainagar and one Vidhan Sabha segment in the adjoining Buldhana district, Malkapur.

Members of Legislative Assembly
 1951: Sane Nilkanth Ganesh Indian National Congress
 1957: Dattatraya Senu Bhirud Indian National Congress
 1962: Dattatraya Senu Bhirud Indian National Congress
 1967: Phalak P.S. Indian National Congress
 1972: Prabhakar Senu Mahajan Indian National Congress
 1977: Bhole Devidas Namdeo Indian National Congress
 1980: Bagwan Mohammad Yasin Raj Mohammad Indian National Congress (I)
 1985: Chaudhari Dagadu Kashiram Janata Party
 1990: Phalak Nilkanth Chintaman Indian National Congress
 1995: Bhole Dilip Atmaram Shiv Sena
 1999: Bhole Dilip Atmaram Shiv Sena
 2004: Chaudhari Santosh Bhau Chabildas, Nationalist Congress Party
 2009: Sanjay Waman Sawakare, Nationalist Congress Party
 2014: Sanjay Waman Sawakare, Bharatiya Janata Party
 2019: Sanjay Waman Sawakare, Bharatiya Janata Party

See also
 Bhusawal
 List of constituencies of Maharashtra Vidhan Sabha

References

Assembly constituencies of Maharashtra
Bhusawal